ABP Induction Systems is a global industrial firm that develops and integrates induction-related equipment and services for foundries, forges, tube and pipe producers, general manufacturers using heating equipment, and manufacturers of microelectronics. With foundry headquarters in Dortmund, Germany, induction heating headquarters in Brookfield, WI United States, and operations in China, Sweden, Thailand, Russia, Mexico, India, Japan, and Brazil, ABP operates worldwide.

History 
In 1903, the predecessor of ABP, ASEA (Allmanna Svenska Elektriska Aktiebolaget) in Sweden built the first induction channel furnace for foundry operations.

In order to expend the know-how of the company and to consolidate its market position, ASEA decided to merge in 1988 with Brown Boveri from Switzerland and to form ABB (Asea Brown Boveri). The new firm added sophisticated control, automation and information technology to the products, and supplemented them with consulting, planning, start-up, and training services. Today their components and systems are used in nearly every foundry throughout the world.

In 2005, with the backing of a group of experienced foundry industry investors, the Foundry Systems group was acquired from ABB, and ABP Induction, LLC was born.

In 2008 ABP Induction and the Pillar Induction Company combined their operations into ABP Induction.

In January 2011, Ajax Tocco Magnethermic acquired the assets and intellectual property formerly known as Pillar from ABP Induction. The sale included the Brookfield, Wisconsin, and Sterling Heights, Michigan operations. ABP's induction melting operations in North Brunswick, NJ, and Massillon, OH, were unaffected, as were its international operations including ABP Induction Systems 
Shanghai, previously known as Pillar Shanghai.

Locations
ABP Induction Systems has locations in 11 countries:

 ABP Induction LLC (Foundry Division), North Brunswick, NJ,
 ABP Induction Systems GmbH, Dortmund,
 ABP Induction Furnaces (PTY) Ltd. Johannesburg,
 ABP Induction Systems (Shanghai) Co. Ltd., No.118, Shanghai,
 ABP Induction Systems Pvt. Ltd., Vadodara,
 ABP Induction Systems, S. de R.L. de C.V., Santa Catarina, N.L.,
 ABP Induction Systems GmbH, Moscow,
 ABP Induction AB, Norberg,
 ABP Induction Ltd., Pathumthanee,
 Biuro Techniczno Handlowe, Katowice, and
 ABP Induction Systems K.K., Kobe.

References

External links
 Official website 

Manufacturing companies based in Dortmund
Industrial furnaces